Abies pindrow, the pindrow fir or west Himalayan fir, is a fir native to the western Himalaya and adjacent mountains, from northeast Afghanistan east through northern Pakistan and India to central Nepal.

Description 

It has a conical crown with level branches.
The shoots are greyish-pink to buff-brown, smooth and glabrous (hairless).

The closely related Gamble's fir occurs in the same area but on somewhat drier sites; it differs in shorter leaves 2–4 cm long with less obvious stomatal bands and arranged more radially round the shoot. The cones are very similar.

Recent research, however, has shown that Abies gamblei is not related to Abies pindrow. At West Himalayan locations in Himachal state in India visited by members of the Dendrological Atlas team, at around 3000 m the latter species is replaced by Abies gamblei, showing no intermediate forms. Such areas included Churdhar and the upper Sangla Valley at elevations between 3000 and 3400 m where these species have morphologically and ecologically clearly separated. Some references of  naming (in error) "Abies spectabilis" in the western Himalayas, most probably are true for Abies gamblei, but to confirm this would require further research.

Distribution and habitat 

Uses 
The pindrow fir is used to a small extent for timber in its native range. It is occasionally grown as an ornamental tree in large gardens in western Europe, but demands high humidity and rainfall to grow well. The name pindrow derives from the tree's name in Nepali.

References

External links
Gymnosperm Database: Abies pindrow

pindrow
Trees of Afghanistan
Flora of Tibet
Trees of the Indian subcontinent
Trees of temperate climates